The Kickxellales are an order of fungi classified under Kickxellomycotina. It contains the single family Kickxellaceae, which contains roughly 37 species as of 2014.

It is not monophyletic.

Fungi of this order are rarely encountered; they are usually saprotrophic, coprophilus, or rarely mycoparasitic. Most species release their spores in a droplet of fluid upon reaching maturity.

Genera
Coemansia
Dipsacomyces
Kickxella
Linderina
Martensella
Martensiomyces
Mycoëmilia
Myconymphaea
Pinnaticoemansia
Ramicandelaber
Spirodactylon
Spiromyces

References

Zygomycota
Fungus orders